Estwick is a surname. Notable people with the surname include:

Ernest Estwick (1903–1984), Guyanese cricketer
Roddy Estwick (born 1961), Barbadian cricketer
Sampson Estwick (1657–1739), English musician
Samuel Estwick ( 1736–1795), West India planter and British politician